The Harvard Mark IV was an electronic stored-program computer built by Harvard University under the supervision of Howard Aiken for the United States Air Force. The computer was finished being built in 1952. It stayed at Harvard, where the Air Force used it extensively.

The Mark IV was all electronic.  The Mark IV used magnetic drum and had 200 registers of ferrite magnetic-core memory (one of the first computers to do so). It separated the storage of data and instructions in what is known as the Harvard architecture.

See also
 Harvard Mark I
 Harvard Mark II
 Harvard Mark III
 List of vacuum-tube computers
 Howard Aiken
 Harvard (World War II advanced trainer aircraft)

References

Further reading
A History of Computing Technology, Michael R. Williams, 1997, IEEE Computer Society Press,

External links
 Harvard Mark IV 64-bit Magnetic Shift Register at ComputerHistory.org

1950s computers
Computer-related introductions in 1952
Vacuum tube computers
One-of-a-kind computers
Harvard University